The 1950–51 Scottish League Cup was the fifth season of Scotland's second football knockout competition. The competition was won by Motherwell, who defeated Hibernian in the Final.

First round

Group 1

Group 2

Group 3

Group 4

Group 5

Group 6

Group 7

Group 8

Quarter-finals

First Leg

Second Leg

Replay

2nd Replay

Semi-finals

Final

References

General

Specific

1950–51 in Scottish football
Scottish League Cup seasons